Yaspi Boby (born 28 October 1987) is an Indonesian sprinter. He competed in the 100 metres event at the 2015 World Championships in Athletics in Beijing, China.

References

External links

1987 births
Living people
Indonesian male sprinters
World Athletics Championships athletes for Indonesia
Southeast Asian Games medalists in athletics
Place of birth missing (living people)
Southeast Asian Games silver medalists for Indonesia
Southeast Asian Games bronze medalists for Indonesia
Athletes (track and field) at the 2018 Asian Games
Competitors at the 2013 Southeast Asian Games
Competitors at the 2015 Southeast Asian Games
Competitors at the 2017 Southeast Asian Games
Asian Games competitors for Indonesia
21st-century Indonesian people